The 2022 Connecticut Secretary of the State election took place on November 8, 2022, to elect the next Secretary of the State of Connecticut. Incumbent Democrat Denise Merrill planned to retire at the end of her elected term, but resigned June 30 to care for her ailing husband. Governor Lamont appointed former associate attorney general Mark Kohler to the position. Kohler was sworn in July 11. He was not a candidate for the office in the November election.

Democratic primary

Candidates

Nominee
Stephanie Thomas, member of the Connecticut House of Representatives from the 143rd district (2021–)

Eliminated in primary
Maritza Bond, New Haven health director

Withdrawn
Darryl Brackeen Jr., New Haven alderman (running for state house)
Josh Elliott, member of the Connecticut House of Representatives from the 88th district (2017–) (running for re-election)
Matt Lesser, member of the Connecticut State Senate from the 9th district (2019–)
Hilda Santiago, member of the Connecticut House of Representatives from the 84th district (2013–)

Declined
Mark Kohler, incumbent secretary of the state

Endorsements

Results

Republican primary

Candidates

Nominee
Dominic Rapini, senior account manager at Apple and candidate for U.S. Senate in 2018

Eliminated in primary
Terrie Wood, state representative from the 141st district (2009–)

Withdrawn 

 Brock Weber, executive aide to New Britain mayor Erin Stewart

Endorsements

Results

Independent Party of Connecticut primary

Candidates

Nominee
Cynthia Jennings, environmental attorney

Libertarian primary

Nominee
Stephen Dincher, chairman of the Libertarian Party of Connecticut

Green primary

Nominee
Douglas Lary

General election

Debate 
A debate was held on October 18 at the University of Hartford.

Predictions

Results

References

External links
Official campaign websites
Dominic Rapini (R) for Secretary of State
Stephanie Thomas (D) for Secretary of State

Secretary of State
Connecticut
Connecticut Secretary of State elections